Livio Sciandra (born 23 September 1980) is a former Italian male middle distance runner who won an individual medal at the 2007 Summer Universiade and won five national titles at senior level.

Achievements

National titles
He won 5 national championships at individual senior level.
Italian Athletics Championships
800 metres: 2003, 2007, 2008
Italian Indoor Athletics Championships
800 metres: 2002, 2008

References

External links
 

1980 births
Living people
Italian male middle-distance runners
Athletics competitors of Centro Sportivo Aeronautica Militare
Universiade medalists in athletics (track and field)
Universiade bronze medalists for Italy
Athletics competitors of Centro Sportivo Carabinieri
Medalists at the 2007 Summer Universiade
Athletes (track and field) at the 2009 Mediterranean Games
Mediterranean Games competitors for Italy
Sportspeople from Turin